The Daily Globe is a daily newspaper based in Ironwood, Michigan.

The Daily Globe serves Gogebic and Ontonagon counties in Michigan and Iron County in Wisconsin.

External links
Official website

Gogebic County, Michigan
Ontonagon County, Michigan
Iron County, Wisconsin
Newspapers published in Michigan